Vigdis Ystad (13 January 1942 – 7 December 2019) was a Norwegian literary historian.

Biography
She was born in Verdal, Norway. In 1974 she became dr.philos. at the University of Oslo. 
She was a university lecturer at the University of Oslo  1973–74, lecturer 1975–79 and professor from 1979.
She was a member of the Norwegian Academy of Science and Letters, the Royal Society of Sciences in Uppsala, the Royal Academy of Science and Antiquities, the Norwegian Academy and the Norwegian Language and Literature Society.  In 2012, Vigdis Ystad was appointed a knight of the 1st class of the Order of St. Olav. 

She  was married to fellow literary historian Daniel Haakonsen (1917–1989)
She died in December 2019.

References

1942 births
2019 deaths
People from Verdal
Norwegian literary historians
University of Oslo alumni
Academic staff of the University of Oslo
Henrik Ibsen researchers